Daniel Sebastian Hernandez (born August 12, 1993) is an American born professional soccer player.

Career

College and amateur
Hernandez played four years of college soccer, spending two years at Lassen Community College where he was an All-American his both years as well as being named the Defensive Player of the Year in 2012 in the state of California before transferring to the University of Nevada, Las Vegas in 2013.

Following college, Hernandez spent time with USL PDL side Las Vegas Mobsters in 2016 and NPSL side FC Mulhouse Portland in 2017. Also, in 2017, he was part of the Portland Timbers organization by training with the Portland Timbers U23s.

Professional
In January 2018, Hernandez was part of the first five players that signed with USL Championship club Las Vegas Lights FC ahead of their inaugural 2018 season.

Prior to signing with USL Championship club Las Vegas Lights FC, Hernandez has had plenty of other experiences. He spent time training in Germany with Stuttgarter Kickers until club and player could not come to an agreement on contract. Hernandez also spent time in France with FC Mulhouse.

Hernandez was also offered to play professionally in Australia with Moreton Bay United FC as well as professional indoor soccer for the Las Vegas Legends.

References

External links 
 

1993 births
Living people
American soccer players
UNLV Rebels men's soccer players
Las Vegas Mobsters players
Las Vegas Lights FC players
Association football midfielders
Soccer players from Nevada
USL League Two players
USL Championship players